Tan Tarı (born 1935) is a retired heavyweight Greco-Roman wrestler from Turkey. He competed at the 1960 Summer Olympics and finished ninth.

References

External links
 

1935 births
Living people
Sportspeople from Ankara
Olympic wrestlers of Turkey
Wrestlers at the 1960 Summer Olympics
Turkish male sport wrestlers